Somaiya may refer to:

 Somaiya Vidyavihar 
 K. J. Somaiya College of Engineering
 K. J. Somaiya Institute of Engineering and Information Technology 
 Karamshi Jethabhai Somaiya